The knockout stage of the 1958 FIFA World Cup was the second and final stage of the competition, following the group stage. The knockout stage began on 19 June with the quarter-finals and ended on 29 June 1958 with the final match, held at the Råsunda Stadium in Solna. The top two teams from each group (eight in total) advanced to the knockout stage to compete in a single-elimination style tournament. A third place play-off also was played between the two losing teams of the semi-finals.

Brazil won the final 5–2 against hosts Sweden for their first World Cup title.

All times listed are local time.

Qualified teams
The top two placed teams from each of the four groups qualified for the knockout stage.

Bracket

Quarter-finals

Brazil vs Wales

France vs Northern Ireland

Sweden vs Soviet Union

West Germany vs Yugoslavia

Semi-finals

Brazil vs France

Sweden vs West Germany

3rd place play-off

Final

References

External links
 1958 FIFA World Cup archive

1958 FIFA World Cup
1958
Sweden at the 1958 FIFA World Cup
West Germany at the 1958 FIFA World Cup
France at the 1958 FIFA World Cup
Yugoslavia at the 1958 FIFA World Cup
Brazil at the 1958 FIFA World Cup
Northern Ireland at the 1958 FIFA World Cup
Wales at the 1958 FIFA World Cup
Soviet Union at the 1958 FIFA World Cup